Beasley is an unincorporated community in Marshall County, in the U.S. state of Tennessee.

History
A post office called Beasley was established in 1880, and remained in operation until 1904. Beside post office, the community had a country store.

References

Unincorporated communities in Marshall County, Tennessee
Unincorporated communities in Tennessee